Åkerberg Fransson (2013) C-617/10 is an EU law case, concerning human rights in the European Union.

Facts 
Mr Hans Åkerberg Fransson claimed he should not have criminal proceedings brought against him after he had already got tax fines. The Åklagaren (Public Prosecutor's Office) prosecuted Mr Fransson for fraudulently misstating his liabilities for income and Value Added Tax, failing to declare employers' contributions in his work as a fisherman on the Kalix River. Directive 2006/112/EC harmonised principles of those taxes. He got fines for 2004 and 2005 in 2007. Then criminal prosecutions began. CFREU article 50 says that nobody shall be tried or punished twice for a criminal conviction (ne bis in idem, not the same thing twice). ECHR Protocol 7, article 4 contains the same.

Judgment
The Court of Justice, Grand Chamber, held that a tax penalty, for value added tax, if not criminal in nature can be imposed. EU law does not govern relations of member states to the ECHR. However, it precludes a national law disapplying provisions contrary to the CFREU, as it withholds a power to assess fully whether a provision is compatible with the Charter.

See also

European Union law

Notes

References

Court of Justice of the European Union case law